Bhimphedi, is a village located in Makwanpur District of Bagmati Province of Nepal. This village is known for its bazaar (marketplace).  Bismuth ore is mined here.

Etymology
The word "Bhimphedi" comes from the Sanskrit name Bhīma (one of the Pāṇḍava brothers mentioned in the Mahabharata) and the Nepali word phedi which means the base of a hill.  According to local beliefs, Bhīma and his brothers stayed in the forests near here during their time in exile, so the place was called Bhimphedi.

History
Before the construction of highways, goods from India were taken to the Kathmandu Valley through here.  The first motor vehicles in Nepal were physically carried by teams of men through this village.

This village served as the district headquarters of Makwanpur District before it was shifted to Hetauda. The village market suffered tremendously after the headquarters moved.

Geography
Bhimphedi is located to the south of the Kathmandu Valley in Makwanpur district of Bagmati Province, Nepal. The VDC is bounded by: 
 North: Thaha Municipality, Indrasarobar Rural Municipality
 South: Nibuwatar VDC, Budhichaur VDC
 East: Sisneri Mahadevsthan VDC, Kogate VDC
 West: Namtar VDC, Bhainse VDC

Demographics
According to 2001 Nepal census, there were 1107 houses in Bhimphedi and 5742 (49% male, 51% female) people. The main population living in the market are Newars. There are Tamang and Khas population in villages.

Transportation
The main roads to Bhimphedi are:
 Hetaunda-Bhimphedi Road (23 km)
 Bhimphedi-Kulekhani-Fakhel-Kathmandu (53 km)
 Bhainse-Bhimphedi-Chitlang-Thankot Road (Ganesh Man Singh Road)

See also
Makwanpur District
Narayani Zone
Nepal
Churia Tunnel

References

Populated places in Makwanpur District